A Sicilian Romance is a gothic novel by Ann Radcliffe.  It was her second published work, and was first published anonymously in 1790.

Summary 
The plot concerns the fallen nobility of the house of Mazzini, on the northern shore of Sicily, as related by a tourist who learns of their turbulent history from a monk he meets at the ruins of their once-magnificent castle.

The Marquis Mazzini's daughters, Emilia and Julia, are beautiful and accomplished young ladies. Julia quickly falls in love with the young and handsome Italian count Hippolitus de Vereza, but to her dismay her father decides that she should marry Duke de Luovo instead. After much thought Julia attempts to elope with Hippolitus on the night before her wedding. However, their escape has been anticipated, and the Marquis ambushes and seemingly kills Hippolitus, whose body is carried away by his servants. He insists that Julia to accept the engagement with de Luovo, but after much difficulty she escapes again alone.

Mazzini and De Luovo spend much of the novel trying to catch Julia, who has to flee from her various hiding places as she narrowly avoids capture and eventually ends up, by a secret tunnel, in the abandoned and seemingly haunted southern apartments of the Mazzini castle. There she finds that her mother, thought to be dead, has instead been imprisoned there for years by the Marquis, who had grown to despise her. The Marquis's new wife, Maria de Vellorno, is discovered and accused of infidelity by her husband, therefore she poisons the Marquis and stabs herself. Before he dies, the Marquis confesses to Ferdinand, his son, that his mother has been imprisoned, and hands him the keys. However, his mother and Julia have already been freed by Hippolitus, who had recovered from his wounds. Ferdinand then finds them at a lighthouse on the coast, waiting to leave for Italy, and they are all joyfully reunited.

Major themes 
The introduction to the Oxford World's Classics edition notes that in this novel "Ann Radcliffe began to forge the unique mixture of the psychology of terror and poetic description that would make her the great exemplar of the Gothic novel, and the idol of the Romantics".  The novel explores the "cavernous landscapes and labyrinthine passages of Sicily's castles and convents to reveal the shameful secrets of its all-powerful aristocracy" .

Characters 
 Ferdinand Mazzini – Marquis 
 Louisa Bernini – Marquis' first wife, mother of his three children
 Maria de Vellorno – Marquis' second wife
 Emilia – Marquis' older daughter
 Julia – Marquis' younger daughter
 Ferdinand – Marquis' son
 Madame de Menon – governess of Mazzini girls, childhood friend of their mother
 Count Hippolitus de Vereza – the man Julia wishes to marry
 Duke de Luovo – the man Julia's father wants her to marry
 Riccardo – de Luovo’s son, leader of banditti
 Robert – servant
 Vincent – servant
 Peter – servant 
 Caterina – Julia’s servant, whose parents help hide her
 Cornelia – nun at St. Augustin’s, Hippolitus’s sister

External links

References

1790 novels
Novels by Ann Radcliffe
British horror novels
English Gothic novels
Romanticism
Sentimental novels
British thriller novels
British romance novels
Novels set in Sicily
Works published anonymously